The 1927 DePaul Blue Demons football team was an American football team that represented DePaul University as an independent during the 1927 college football season. In its third season under head coach Eddie Anderson, the team compiled a 1–5–1 record and was outscored by a total of 171 to 57.

Schedule

References

DePaul
DePaul Blue Demons football seasons
DePaul Blue Demons football